William Percy Miller Jr. (June 6, 1931 – January 11, 2003), was a minor league baseball player who broke the color barrier in the Carolina League.  He was born and died in Danville, Virginia. The son of Negro league pitcher Percy Miller, he first played for the Danville Stars, a Negro team.  He made his debut with the Danville Leafs, the first integrated pro team in Virginia, on August 9, 1951, and played nineteen games that season.  He was "released" in February 1952 as not being polished enough, and returned to the Stars.

External links

1931 births
2003 deaths
Sportspeople from Danville, Virginia
African-American baseball players
20th-century African-American sportspeople
21st-century African-American people